Haluk Kakış (25 January 1932 – 23 November 2020) was a Turkish sailor. He competed in the Finn event at the 1964 Summer Olympics.

References

External links
 

1932 births
2020 deaths
Turkish male sailors (sport)
Olympic sailors of Turkey
Sailors at the 1964 Summer Olympics – Finn
Sportspeople from Trabzon